Abdol Rahman Safarzayi (also Romanized as ʿAbdol Raḩmān Şafarzāyī) is a village in Jahanabad Rural District, in the Central District of Hirmand County, Sistan and Baluchestan Province, Iran. At the 2006 census, its population was 478, in 106 families.

References 

Populated places in Hirmand County